Tiny was a British cyclecar manufactured by Nanson, Barker & Co at Esholt, Yorkshire between 1912 and 1915.

The first car, the 8 hp, produced in 1912 was powered by an air-cooled JAP V-twin engine, three-speed gearbox and chain drive. Unlike many cyclecars a differential was fitted to the rear axle. The two-seater bodywork was in aluminium with a wheelbase of 96 inches (2440 mm) and the range included a van. Springing was half-elliptic springs front and rear and braking was by external bands on the rear wheels. The car cost about £100 and was claimed to be capable of 50 mph (80 km/h). It was exhibited at the 1912 London Motor Cycle show.

In 1913 the engine was replaced by a water-cooled Precision, V twin of 964 cc. There were other improvements including changing the brakes to internal expanding and replacing the chain with shaft drive. The price rose to £135.

Just before the outbreak of war, in mid-1914, came the final Tiny called the 10/15. This one was a proper light car and had a four-cylinder Dorman engine of 1177 cc. It cost £157.

It is uncertain how many Tinys were made but output was small.

After the First World War, the same company produced cars under Airedale brand.

See also
 List of car manufacturers of the United Kingdom

References 

Cyclecars
Defunct motor vehicle manufacturers of England
Defunct companies based in Yorkshire